Del Val is a surname. Notable people with the surname include:

 Dominguito del Val, Spanish martyr
 Jean Del Val, French actor
 Rafael Merry del Val, Spanish cardinal
 Ricardo del Val, Argentine politician

See also
 Del (disambiguation)
 Val (disambiguation)
 Del Valle (disambiguation)